HP59 is a pathologic angiogenesis capillary endothelial marker protein (7 or 12 transmembrane domains) which has been identified as the receptor for the Group B Streptococcal Toxin (GBS Toxin) molecule known as CM101, the etiologic agent for early-onset versus late-onset Group B Strep.

Expression 

Fu, et al. coined the term "pathological angiogenesis" to distinguish between HP59-expressing, and non-HP59-expressing capillaries, however, other researchers have not used this terminology. Therefore it is not yet known whether HP59 is expressed in vasculogenesis, arteriogenesis, sprouting angiogenesis or intussusceptive angiogenesis.  However capillaries in all tumor tissues examined were positive for anti-HP59 antibodies and Von Willebrand factor (vWF) antibodies, while in normal tissues only vWF staining was observed.

The target protein for GBStoxin/CM101 is expressed in vasculature of developing organs during their formation during embryogenesis. The lung is the last organ to develop so HP59 is present in the newborn lung for 5–10 days after birth, explaining the susceptibility to GBS induced "early onset" disease. HP59 lectin is expressed later in life only in pathologic angiogenesis, providing a receptor for CM101. The CM101-HP59 complex then activates complement, and initiates an inflammatory cytokine cascade which recruits CD69 positive activated granulocytes to destroy the capillaries and surrounding pathologic tissue.   CM101 has been shown in a published Phase I, FDA-approved clinical trial under IND to have clinical safety and effectivity on select stage IV cancer patients, specifically targeting tumor vasculature

HP59 is expressed in the adult in wound healing, and in tumor angiogenesis, as shown in mice.

The gene for HP59 contains, entirely within its coding region, the Sialin Gene SLC17A5 (Solute carrier family 17 (anion/sugar transporter). Member 5, also known asSLC17A5 or sialin is a lysosomal membrane sialic acid transport protein which in humans is encoded by the SLC17A5 gene on Chromosome 6, and appears to be important in CNS myelination.  HP59  has a transcription initiation site 300bp upstream of the initiation site for the Sialin Gene SLC17A5, and encodes 41 additional aminoacids at the Amino-terminal.   Thus, using an upstream transcription initiation site, and thus a different start codon, HP59, incorporating the Sialin gene product, becomes a pathologic angiogenesis capillary endothelial cell luminal membrane protein with unknown function, which the GBS Toxin CM101 specifically targets.   Endothelial involvement is indicated by levels of Soluble E-Selectin.

References 

Proteins